The Mystery of Being is a two-volume book of existential philosophy by Gabriel Marcel. The two volumes are, "Reflection and Mystery" and "Faith and Reality". First published in 1951, the book is a collection of Gifford Lectures given by Marcel while at the University of Aberdeen between 1949 and 1950.

References

External links
 http://plato.stanford.edu/entries/marcel/
 http://www.angelfire.com/md2/timewarp/marcel.html

1951 non-fiction books
Books by Gabriel Marcel
Existentialist books
French non-fiction books